The 1957 All-Pacific Coast football team consists of American football players chosen by various organizations for All-Pacific Coast teams for the 1957 NCAA University Division football season.

Selections

Backs
 Bob Newman, Washington State (AP-1 [quarterback]; Coaches-1; UP-1)
 Jim Shanley, Oregon (AP-1 [halfback]; Coaches-1; UP-1)
 Joe Francis, Oregon State (AP-1 [halfback]; Coaches-1; UP-1)
 Jim Jones, Washington (AP-1 [fullback]; Coaches-1; UP-1)
 Jack Douglas, Stanford (Coaches-2; UP-2)
 Bob Mulgrado, Arizona State (UP-2)
 Chuck Shea, Stanford (Coaches-2; UP-2)
 Jack Morris, Oregon (Coaches-2; UP-2)
 Nub Beamer, Oregon State (Coaches-2)
 Earnel Durden, Oregon State (Coaches-2)
 Joe Kapp, California (Coaches-2)

Ends
 Don Ellingsen, Washington State (AP-1; Coaches-1; UP-1)
 Dick Wallen, UCLA (AP-1; Coaches-1; UP-1)
 Gary Van Galder, Stanford (Coaches-2; UP-2)
 Ron Stover, Oregon (Coaches-2; UP-2)
 Ron Wheatcroft, Oregon (Coaches-2)
 Bob DeGrant, Oregon State (Coaches-2)

Tackles
 Troy Barbee, Stanford (AP-1; Coaches-1; UP-1)
 Bill Leeka, UCLA (AP-1; Coaches-1; UP-1)
 Ted Bates, Oregon (Coaches-2; UP-2)
 Dave Jesmer, Oregon State (Coaches-2; UP-2)
 Mike Henry, USC (Coaches-2)

Guards
 Harry Mondale, Oregon (AP-1; Coaches-1; UP-1)
 Jerry Kramer, Idaho (Coaches-1; UP-2)
 Jim Brackins, Oregon State (Coaches-2; UP-1)
 John "Whitey" Core, Washington (AP-1; Coaches-2)
 Al Carr, Arizona State (UP-2)

Centers
 Francis "Buzz" Randall, Oregon State (AP-1; Coaches-1)
 Marv Bergmann, Washington (UP-1)
 Merl Hitzel, Washington State (UP-2)
 Wayne Walker, Idaho (Coaches-2)

Key

AP = Associated Press, selected by three regional AP sports editors in Seattle, San Francisco, and Los Angeles

Coaches = selected by the conference coaches

UP = United Press

Bold = Consensus first-team selection of at least two of the selectors from among the AP, UP and conference coaches

See also
1957 College Football All-America Team

References

All-Pacific Coast Football Team
All-Pacific Coast football teams
All-Pac-12 Conference football teams